Federal Route 1157, or Jalan Lepang Nering, is a federal road in Perak, Malaysia. The roads connects Ayer Panas to Kampung Baharu.

At most sections, the Federal Route 1157 was built under the JKR R5 road standard, with a speed limit of 90 km/h.

List of junctions and towns 

Malaysian Federal Roads